KGDM may refer to:

 Gardner Municipal Airport (Massachusetts) (ICAO code KGDM)
 KGDM-LP, a low-power radio station (105.5 FM) licensed to Merced, California, United States